The Australia national under-23 soccer team represents Australia in international under-23 soccer and at the Olympic Games. The team is controlled by the governing body for soccer in Australia, Football Australia (FA), which is currently a member of the Asian Football Confederation (AFC) and the regional ASEAN Football Federation (AFF) since leaving the Oceania Football Confederation (OFC) in 2006. The team's official nickname is the Olyroos.

Australia's first two appearances in the Olympic Games saw the senior men's team participate, but in 1992 the eligibility was restricted to players under the age of 23, while in 1996, it was decided to allow teams to choose three over-age players in the final Olympic squads.

The team has represented Australia at the Olympic Games on six occasions, in 1992, 1996, 2000, 2004, 2008 and 2020 games. The team also represented Australia at the AFC U-23 Championship tournaments in 2013, 2016, 2018 & 2020.

History

Early years
The Australian national under-23 team made its international debut in 1967, when it took part in a triangular tournament against New Caledonia and New Zealand in Nouméa. Australia lost its first game 2–1 on 6 November, and won its second 1–3 on 10 November, with Garry Manuel supplying goals in both games. The team next played almost eight years later in 1974, in a tour of Indonesia, sponsored by the Australian Government. During the tour, Australia, coached by Eric Worthington, won all three match against the host nation. It would then be another 16 years before the team competed in international competition of any kind.

In August 1990, Australia played a series of friendly matches in Europe under coach Eddie Thomson. The first against Switzerland ended in a 0–0 draw. The second match was played against the League of Ireland XI, and ended in a 2–2 draw, with goals from Gary Hasler and John Gibson. Australia's final match was lost 2–0 against Czechoslovakia.

Olympic Games

1992 Barcelona Olympics
Arguably Australia's most successful Olympic football tournament, the squad coached by Eddie Thomson contained just two overseas based players: KV Mechelen striker Zlatko Arambasic and Club Brugge midfielder Paul Okon, as the rest of the squad hailed from NSL clubs. The squad saw Mark Bosnich, John Filan, Tony Vidmar and Tony Popovic, and most importantly, Ned Zelic, who had virtually single-handedly gotten the Olyroos to Barcelona with a sensational double strike in the second leg play off against the much admired Dutch team, take part before commencing their successful careers in Europe.

Drawn with Mexico, Denmark and Ghana, the Olyroos would take on the Africans in Zaragoza in their first round fixture. An early goal on 12 minutes, a long range free kick by Mohammed Gargo set the tone for Ghana as they held onto that lead until the 83rd minute when it was extended to 2–0 by Kwame Ayew. Ayew grabbed another on 89 minutes before Tony Vidmar scored a consolation goal for Australia on 91 minutes to bring the score to 3–1. John Filan was eventually dropped after this game after coming under heavy criticism for failing to put up a wall for Ghana's first goal, and the ever green Mark Bosnich was brought in, cementing his spot in the side for the Olympics.

Two days later in Barcelona, Zlatko Arambasic opened the scoring after 20 minutes as Australia lead Mexico 1–0 until the 63rd minute when Jorge Castañeda leveled the tie at 1–1, the game would finish this way which meant that Australia would need to win their last group stage game to proceed to the knock-out stages.

The Olyroos finally put in a performance worthy of note as the entire team began to fire on all cylinders, winning 3–0 against Denmark to book a spot in the quarter-finals. The game saw one first half goal by John Markovski and two second half goals thanks to Damian Mori and Tony Vidmar.

Australia and Ghana progressed to the knock-out stages where Australia were tied to play against Sweden in Barcelona. In front of 30, 000 spectators at the Camp Nou, John Markovski put Australia ahead after 30 minutes. A 53rd-minute strike by Shaun Murphy put the Olyroos 2–0 up until Patrik Andersson scored one back for Sweden on 62 minutes. The game stayed at 2–1 and the result sent the Olyroos to the semi-finals where they would face Poland.

At the Camp Nou in front of 45,000 spectators, Poland struck on 27 minutes, taking the lead after a goal from Wojciech Kowalczyk. Australia, however, hit back on 35 minutes when Adelaide City striker Carl Veart equalised. Just before half time though, Mark Viduka lashed out at a Polish defender, earning himself a straight red card, and leaving the Australian's a man down against a Polish side who were technically gifted all over the park. Poland truly came to life in the second period, putting on a dazzling display of soccer and scoring five goals in the process, which saw a hat-trick from Andrzej Juskowiak and an own goal from Shaun Murphy, to take out the game at 6–1.

In the bronze medal game, Australia would meet up with group stage outfit Ghana, who took the lead when Isaac Asare scored after 19 minutes and eventually winning the game 1–0, the result left the Olyroos to claim fourth spot at the tournament, as Spain would finish in first place after beating Poland 3–2.

1996 Atlanta Olympics
Eddie Thomson took a young squad to the United States, which included Aurelio Vidmar and Steve Horvat as the overaged players, the squad was combined of 7 overseas players out of the 18 men squad. A young Mark Viduka was in his second year at Dinamo Zagreb in Croatia and Kevin Muscat had just signed with English Premier League club Crystal Palace. Drawn into Group B with European heavy weights Spain and France, as well as Saudi Arabia, the Olyroos would lose 2–0 to France in their opening clash thanks to goals from Robert Pires and Florian Maurice, as Australia's Danny Tiatto saw a red card just after 24 minutes. A 2–1 win over Saudi Arabia earnt the Olyroos their first 3 points of the campaign. Peter Tsekenis scored after just 12 minutes before the Saudis were able to draw level through Mohammed Al Khilaiwi on 37 minutes. On 63 minutes Mark Viduka put Australia in front as Australia came out winners at 2–1. After leading Spain 2–0 courtesy of two early goals from Aurelio Vidmar, Raúl González scored one on 40 minutes, Santiago Denia added after 86 minutes to level the tie. Shortly after, the deadlock was broken as Raúl netted on the 90th minute to seal victory for Spain. The result had eliminated Australia from tournament as Spain and France progressed to the knock-out stages.

2000 Sydney Olympics
In a full-strength side, which included Stan Lazaridis, Josip Skoko and Mark Viduka as over aged players, under coach Raul Blanco the Olyroos were drawn against Italy, Nigeria and Honduras in Group A. In front of 93, 252 spectators at the Melbourne Cricket Ground, Australia were defeated 1–0 by an Italian Andrea Pirlo goal after 81 minutes. At the Sydney Football Stadium, Australia's second group stage fixture saw them down 2–0 against Nigeria after just 22 minutes. Two goals in the space of just four minutes from Hayden Foxe and Kasey Wehrman saw Australia draw level just before half time. The second half saw the expulsion of both Brett Emerton and Celestine Babayaro ten minutes after play had commenced. On 64 minutes, Victor Agali's goal was enough to see Nigeria take out the game at 3–2. The result meant that Australia had been knocked out of the tournament with one match remaining. In Sydney, Honduras sealed a 2–1 victory after a brace by Cagliari striker David Suazo. Hondouras would finish in third place, Nigeria and Italy finished in the top two positions whereas the hosts finished in bottom spot on 0 points, much to the disappointment of the local media and then-active Australian Soccer Association.

2004 Athens Olympics
Frank Farina took an 18-man squad which included Millwall's Tim Cahill, Osasuna's striker John Aloisi and Rangers' defender Craig Moore as over aged players. The squad proved to be good enough to reach the final itself, drawing 1–1 with Tunisia thanks to an Aloisi equaliser and beating Serbia and Montenegro in a 5–1 thrashing which saw a brace from Aloisi, Ahmad Elrich and a goal by Cahill. Australia would lose 1–0 to Argentina when Andrés D'Alessandro scored after 9 minutes in their final group stage game as both teams went on to qualify for the knock out stages. Australia would meet Iraq at the quarter-final stage where Emad Mohammed scored after 64 minutes, sending Iraq through to the semi-finals as they won the game 1–0.

2008 Beijing Olympics

The Olyroos' first qualifying game for the 2008 Beijing Olympics was held on 7 February 2007, when Australia hosted Taiwan in Adelaide. Midfielder Kristian Sarkies became the first player to score a hat-trick for the Under-23's in the Asian competition and Australia won the home tie 11–0. They then travelled to Taipei and narrowly edged out the home side 1–0 in difficult conditions to advance to the second stage of the qualifications. In February 2007 the Olyroos played Iran in the first game of the second round, which resulted in a 0–0 draw. In the second game of the round, against Jordan in Adelaide, they drew 1–1. This result left Australia in second spot, four points behind leaders Saudi Arabia. Against Saudi Arabia, Australia won the first leg 2–0 and lost 2–1 in the second. In May 2007 they defeated Iran 3–1. Australia qualified for the third and final round of the Asian qualifications after beating Jordan 4–0 in their final game in June 2007. The Olyroos met Iraq, Korea DPR and Lebanon at the final round (August until November 2007). Australia started their campaign with a scoreless draw against Iraq in Doha. Then the Olyroos went on to win their home games against North Korea (1–0) and Lebanon (3–0). After another scoreless draw against Lebanon in Beirut, Australia was behind Iraq with both eight points but Iraq leading because of the better goal difference. The decisive match was held in Gosford on 17 November 2007 and saw the Olyroos emerging as 2–0 winners thanks to goal from Adrian Leijer and Mark Milligan. The following 1–1 draw against North Korea in Pyongyang sealed Australia's qualification for Beijing, as they finished as group winners with 12 points, one more than Iraq.

When the eventual tournament took place in August 2008, the Olyroos were drawn against Argentina, Côte d'Ivoire and Serbia where coach Graham Arnold had controversially left out overseas-based players Nathan Burns and Bruce Djite, which left half of the squad including domestic players. A hopeful squad looked upon by the public which included Nürnberg's Matthew Spiranovic and Gençlerbirliği's James Troisi, the experience of Archie Thompson and Jade North were included as the over aged players. Shanghai was the venue of Australia's first group stage clash against Serbia, which saw them go in front after 69 minutes thanks to a Ruben Zadkovich goal. Slobodan Rajković however leveled the scores after 78 minutes to end the game at 1–1. Australia's second game was against Argentina, who had beaten Ivory Coast 2–1 in their opening clash. The Olyroos held the Albiceleste at 0–0 until Napoli's Ezequiel Lavezzi latched on to a cross to score after 76 minutes. The full strength Argentina side, a team that included Roman Riquelme, Sergio Agüero and Lionel Messi, took out the game at 1–0 which left Australia in a must-win situation against the Ivory Coast. An 81st minute Salomon Kalou strike gave Côte d'Ivoire a 1–0 victory knocking Australia out of the tournament.

2012 London Olympics
Under coach Aurelio Vidmar, Australia commenced their qualification for the 2012 London Olympic soccer tournament in the second round of qualification where they faced Yemen in a two-game series, the first on 19 June 2011 at Central Coast Stadium in Gosford and the second on 23 June at Newcastle International Sports Centre in Newcastle. Australia won 7–0 on aggregate and progressed to the next stage. For the third round of the qualifiers Australia was drawn into Group B with Iraq, Uzbekistan and the United Arab Emirates, with the group's fixtures commencing in September 2011 and concluding in March 2012. Australia's attempt to qualify for the 2012 Olympic Games failed, with the team finishing last in their group, with four draws and two losses. All four draws were nil-all and Australia failed to score in all six games.

2020 Tokyo Olympics
Australia returned to the Olympics after missing the 2012 and 2016 editions, with the team largely composed of mostly A-League players, a number of Europe-based players and Mitchell Duke as the only over-aged player, being drawn in Group C, alongside Argentina, Spain and Egypt.

Australia, in their first game since the 2008 Summer Olympics, defeated Argentina 2–0 with goals scored by Lachlan Wales and Marco Tilio, as well as having a numerical advantage following the expulsion of Argentina's Francisco Ortega. Australia then nearly held on for a draw to Spain however conceded a goal scored by Mikel Oyarzabal in the 81st minute, ending the game with a 1–0 loss. Australia needed at least a draw against Egypt to progress to the next stage however lost 2–0 and finished last in the group.

2032 Brisbane Olympics
Australia automatically qualified for the 2032 Summer Olympics held in Brisbane.

AFC U23 Championship / Asian Cup

2013 AFC U22 Championship
In July 2012 the Olyroos travelled to Pekanbaru, Indonesia for the qualification round to participate in the inaugural 2013 AFC U-22 Championship. Wins over Indonesia, Macau and Timor-Leste, a draw with Singapore and a heavy loss to Japan left Australia in second place in the group. This was enough to qualify to the final tournament which was hosted by Oman in January 2014.
Despite a 4–0 loss to Japan in the group stage, Australia still managed to top their group, but were eliminated in the quarter final after a 2–1 loss to Saudi Arabia.

2016 AFC U23 Championship
The 2016 AFC U-23 Championship final tournament was held in Qatar from 12 to 30 January 2016. Australia qualified for the tournament by winning all three group matches in the qualification stage in Taiwan in March 2015. The Olyroos recorded comprehensive victories; 6–0 against Hong Kong with Jamie Maclaren scoring three; 4–0 against the hosts Chinese Taipei and 5–1 over Myanmar where Andrew Hoole scored a hat trick.

The 2016 AFC U-23 Championship doubled as the qualifying tournament for the 2016 Summer Olympics Football tournament in Rio de Janeiro. Australia were eliminated from the championship in the group stage. A 1–0 loss to United Arab Emirates followed by a 2–0 win over Vietnam meant that Australia needed to defeat Jordan in the final group match. A nil-all draw resulted in the elimination for Australia from the tournament and hence failure to qualify for the Olympics for the second consecutive time.

2018 AFC U23 Championship
Australia qualified for the 2018 AFC U-23 Championship final tournament in China in January 2018, after wins in the qualifying event against Brunei, Singapore and Myanmar. Australia scored 12 goals and did not concede any during qualification.

Ante Milicic coached the team who failed to get out of the group in the tournament. They won their first match 3–1 against Syria with George Blackwood scoring twice. They then lost the next game to Vietnam 1–0. In the final game against Korea Republic, Australia was three goals down before scoring twice however they were unable to complete the comeback required and the result of 3–2 saw Australia end their tournament third in the group.

2020 AFC U23 Championship
In March 2019 Australia participated in the 2020 AFC U-23 Championship qualification rounds. They travelled to Cambodia who were the hosts of the group that also included Chinese Taipei and South Korea. Australia's first match was a 6–0 win against Cambodia. Two days later they defeated Chinese Taipei by the same scoreline. The eleven group winners and the four best runners-up would qualify for the final tournament held in Thailand in 2020 so Australia needed to ensure they did not lose in the third match against South Korea. Nicholas D'Agostino gave Australia the lead in the 16th minute which he then doubled in the 24th minute. However, the Koreans responded quickly, scoring in the 26th minute and when they equalised in the 63rd minute, this placed them at the top of the group at Australia's expense. The match finished 2-all however, as the best runner-up of the 11 groups, Australia still qualified for the 2020 AFC U-23 Championship as one of the top 4 runner-ups.

The 2020 AFC U-23 Championship was hosted by Thailand and a top three finish was required for Australia to progress to the Olympics for the first time since 2008. Australia, coached by Graham Arnold, faced Iraq in the opening game. Reno Piscopo opened the scoring in the second half although 15 minutes later Iraq equalised and the game finished 1–1. Australia's next match was against the host Thailand. After going behind in the first half, Nicholas D'Agostino leveled the score just before half time and then scored the winner in the 76th minute. Now sitting on top of the group, a win or draw against debutant Bahrain would secure progression. Ramy Najjarine scored Australia's only goal and despite Bahrain scoring in first half injury time, the Olyroos held on to top the group and move through to the quarter-finals.

The quarter-final opponent was Syria and the game entered extra time after a scoreless ninety minutes. Australia's Al Hassan Toure scored the only goal of the game to send them through to the semi-finals for the first time.

Australia next played South Korea, a team that had won all four of its matches in the tournament. The Koreans won the match 2–0 with both goals coming in the second half sending Australia into a third place playoff with defending champions Uzbekistan for the final AFC qualification spot for the 2020 Olympics.

Australia defeated Uzbekistan 1–0 at the Rajamangala Stadium in Bangkok to claim third-place, their best ever finish in the tournament, which also qualified them for the Summer Olympics for the first time since 2008. D'Agostino scored the only goal in the 47th minute. Uzbekistan's Oybek Bozorov was sent off in the 59th minute, just 6 minutes after coming on although Australia couldn't take advantage and didn't add to their tally.

2022 AFC U-23 Asian Cup

Results and fixtures

The following is a list of match results in the last 12 months, as well as any future matches that have been scheduled.

Legend

2022

2023

Coaching staff

Current coaching staff

Players

Current squad
The following 24 players were called up for a European training camp from 20 – 28 March.
Caps and goals correct as of 19 June 2022 after game against Japan.

Recent call-ups
 The following players have been called up within the last 12 months and remain eligible for selection.

Overage players in Olympic Games

Competitive record

In 1992, 1996 and 2004 Olympics, Australia qualified representing OFC, while in 2008 and 2020 representing AFC. They automatically qualified for the 2000 Olympics as hosts.

See also
Sport in Australia
Football in Australia
Australia national soccer team
Australia national under-20 soccer team
Australia national under-17 soccer team

References

External links
 
OZ Football Olyroos Archive

Asian national under-23 association football teams
Football
National youth sports teams of Australia